is a company which owns two tramway lines in the cities of Osaka and Sakai, Osaka, Japan. The parent company is Nankai Electric Railway Co., Ltd.

Lines

Current
Hankai Line (Ebisucho - Hamadera eki-mae) 14.1 km
Uemachi Line (Tennoji eki-mae - Sumiyoshikoen) 4.6 km

The lines use standard gauge tracks and are electrified at 600 Volts via catenary.

Former lines when owned by Nankai Railway
Hirano Line (Imaike - Hirano) 5.9 km
Ohama Branch Line (Shukuin - Ohama-kaigan) 1.4 km

Rolling stock

Current
161 series
351 series
501 series
601 series
701 series
1001 series
1101 series

References

External links

  

Companies based in Osaka Prefecture
Railway companies of Japan
Rail transport in Osaka Prefecture
Tram transport in Japan
Nankai Group